The 2017–18 Texas Longhorns women's basketball team represented the University of Texas at Austin in the 2017–18 NCAA Division I women's basketball season. It was head coach Karen Aston's sixth season at Texas. The Longhorns were members of the Big 12 Conference and played their home games at the Frank Erwin Center. They finished the season 28–7, 15–3 in Big 12 play to finish in second place. They advanced to the championship game of the Big 12 women's basketball tournament where they lost to Baylor. They received at-large bid of the NCAA women's basketball tournament where they defeated Maine and Arizona State in the first and second rounds before losing to UCLA in the Sweet Sixteen.

Previous season
They are coming off a season in which they finished the season 25–9, 15–3 in Big 12 play to finish in second place and advanced to the semifinals of the Big 12 women's basketball tournament where they lost to West Virginia. They received at-large bid of the NCAA women's basketball tournament where they defeated Central Arkansas and NC State in the first and second rounds before losing to Stanford in the Sweet Sixteen.

Off-season

Departures

Joyner Holmes not on roster until 23 December 2017 due to undisclosed violation.

Recruits

|-
| colspan="7" style="padding-left:10px;" | Overall recruiting rankings:
|-
| colspan="7" style="font-size:85%; background:#F5F5F5;" | 

|}

Roster

Schedule

|-
!colspan=12 style="background:#CC5500; color:#FFFFFF;"| Exhibition

|-
!colspan=12 style="background:#CC5500; color:#FFFFFF;"| Regular season

|-
!colspan=12 style="background:#CC5500; color:#FFFFFF;"| Big 12 Women's Tournament

|-
!colspan=12 style="background:#CC5500; color:#FFFFFF;"| NCAA Women's Tournament

Rankings

2017–18 media

Television and radio information
Most University of Texas home games were shown on the Longhorn Network, with national telecasts on the Big 12 Conference's television partners. On the radio, women's basketball games aired on KTXX-HD4 "105.3 The Bat", with select games on KTXX-FM 104.9.

See also
 2017–18 Texas Longhorns men's basketball team

References

Texas Longhorns women's basketball seasons
Texas
Texas
Texas Longhorns
Texas Longhorns